The Far East Command was a British military command which had 2 distinct periods. These were firstly, 18 November 1940 –  7 January 1942 succeeded by the American-British-Dutch-Australian Command (ABDACOM), and secondly, 1963–1971 succeeded by Australia, New Zealand, and United Kingdom Force (ANZUK Force)

1940–1942
The British had two commands with responsibilities for possessions in the Far East. GHQ India under General Sir Archibald Wavell the Commander-in-Chief, India and the Far East Command under Air Marshal Robert Brooke-Popham and from 23 December 1941 by Lieutenant-General Sir Henry Royds Pownall.

The C-in-C Far East Command was responsible directly to the Chiefs of Staff for the operational control and general direction of training of all British land and air forces in Malaya, Burma, and Hong Kong, and for the co-ordination of plans for the defence of those territories. But the CinC exercised no command or control over any naval forces.

It was intended that C-in-C should deal primarily with matters of major military policy and strategy, but it was not the intention that the C-in-C should assume any administrative or financial responsibilities or take over any of the day-to-day functions at that time exercised by the General (or Air) Officers Commanding (GOC) of the different areas. The degree of "operational control" of British land and air forces, which the Commander-in-Chief Far East should assume, was defined as meaning "the higher direction and control" as distinct from "detailed operational control". To complicate matters, the GOCs correspond with the War Office, Air Ministry, Colonial Office and Local Governor's Offices on all matters on which they had previously dealt with those departments. But the GOCs had to keep the C-in-C informed if he wished.

To enable the Commander-in-Chief Far East to carry out his functions, he was allowed a small staff, initially consisting of seven officers drawn from all three Services with the necessary clerical and cipher staff. For intelligence purposes, he had at his disposal the Far East Combined Bureau, though it remained under Admiralty control. Although the establishment of his staff was later increased to fifteen it was never large enough. The Naval Base was a considerable distance across Singapore from the Malaya Army Headquarters which discouraged frequent meetings.

On 5 December 1941 London gave permission for C-in-C Far East Command to decide if Operation Matador should be activated. The chief strategic decision to be decided was whether Siam should be invaded in a pre-emptive move, before any Japanese landings took place. The Malaya Command was responsible for the planning of Operation Matador.

When the Allied governments appointed General Sir Archibald Wavell as supreme commander of American-British-Dutch-Australian Command (ABDACOM), British Far East Command became redundant because its functions would in future be carried out by ABDACOM. So when Wavell arrived in Singapore, where the British Far East Command was based, on 7 January 1942, ABDACOM absorbed the British command in its entirety and C-in-C Far East Command Henry Royds Pownall became Wavell's Chief of Staff. On 15 January, Wavell moved his headquarters to Lembang near Bandung on Java and assumed control of Allied operations.

Commanders-in-Chief
Commanders-in-Chief have included:

After the Far East came under the jurisdiction, from August 1943, of South East Asia Command ('SEAC'). The initial land forces operational area for SEAC had been India, Burma, Ceylon, British Malaya, Sumatra, and, for offensive operations, Siam (Thailand) and French Indochina. On 15 August 1945 this was expanded to include the Dutch East Indies and French Indochina. SEAC was disbanded in 1946 and in 1947 the Army Command was reformed under the name Far East Land Forces.

General Officers Commanding included:
1947 – 1948 General Sir Neil Ritchie
1948 – 1951 General Sir John Harding
1951 – 1953 General Sir Charles Keightley
1953 – 1956 General Sir Charles Loewen
1956 – 1958 General Sir Francis Festing
1958 – 1961 General Sir Richard Hull
1961 – 1963 Lieutenant General Sir Nigel Poett

1963–1971
1963 Far East Command was established, covering the region covered China, Hong Kong, British Commonwealth Occupation Force, Japan and Singapore. Major bases included Hong Kong (HMS Tamar) and Singapore. It was organised as an interservice command:
 Far East Fleet
 Far East Land Forces [British]
 Australian Army Force
 Far East Air Force

On 11 January 1971, Far East Command was disbanded at Singapore, succeeded by ANZUK Force.

Commanders-in-Chief
Commanders-in-Chief have included:

British Commander-in-Chief, Far East Command
 24 April 1963 Admiral Sir Varyl Begg
 28 May 1965 Air Chief Marshal Sir John Grandy
 1 February 1967 General Sir Michael Carver
 7 March 1969 Admiral Sir Peter Hill-Norton
 1970 Air Chief Marshal Sir Brian Burnett

Commander, British Far East Land Forces
 10 April 1963 Lieutenant General Sir Reginald Hewetson
 8 June 1964 Lieutenant General Sir Alan Jolly
 28 July 1966 Lieutenant General Sir Michael Carver
 31 January 1967 Lieutenant General Sir Thomas Pearson
 16 November 1968 Lieutenant General Sir Peter Hunt
 10 October 1970 until 30 October 1971 Major General Sandy Thomas

See also
 RAF Far East Air Force

References

External links
 Percivals Report on assumption of command in Malay
 Burma Army

British rule in Singapore
Military of Singapore under British rule
British Malaya
Military units and formations of the United Kingdom in World War II
Joint commands of the United Kingdom
Military history of Malaya during World War II
Singapore–United Kingdom military relations